Crescent Beach State Park is public recreation area on the Atlantic Ocean in Cape Elizabeth, Maine, United States. The state park features a mile-long, crescent-shaped beach for swimming and sunbathing, fishing, sea kayaking, and trails for hiking and cross-country skiing.

Geology
The park's 1.4-km pocket beach is subject to erosion from wind and water. Measurable erosion seen in 2005 and 2007 also occurred at the smaller, adjoining pocket beach known as Kettle Cove.

Ownership
The state has leased 100 acres of the park from The Sprague Corporation (owned by the privately held Black Point Corporation) since 1961. In 2013, the state's lease was extended for five years at a cost of $500,000. Under the original 50-year lease, the state paid $1 per year for use of the land, an amount that increased to $10,000 annually with a series of one-year lease extensions that began in 2011. The state has expressed interest in purchasing the entire property, one of the largest revenue-generating parks in Maine, when the current lease expires in 2018. In 2012, the Maine State Employees Association (MSEA) protested the possible privatization of the park by Governor Paul LePage's administration, saying privatization would endanger the entire public park system.

References

External links
Crescent Beach State Park Department of Agriculture, Conservation and Forestry

State parks of Maine
Beaches of Maine
Protected areas of Cumberland County, Maine
Portland metropolitan area, Maine
Protected areas established in 1966
Cape Elizabeth, Maine
Landforms of Cumberland County, Maine
Parks in Cumberland County, Maine